The Evolution of Naval Weapons is a United States government textbook by L. Sprague de Camp. It was first published in a 53-page edition by the Training Activity section of the Bureau of Naval Personnel in August 1947 as NAVPERS 91066. A 1949 edition of 67 pages was designated NAVPERS 91066-A. The work was credited to the Bureau rather than de Camp. The 1947 edition was reproduced from a mixture of standard sized (8 1/2" x 11") typed and mimeographed sheets, and was stapled between blue paper covers. The 1949 edition was printed, with the illustrations integrated with the text.

Summary
The work is a 40,000-word study of the history of naval ordnance and armor and consists of twelve chapters plus a short concluding section.

Contents
 Chapter 1. Sticks and Stones.
 Chapter 2. Explosives.
 Chapter 3. Fuzes.
 Chapter 4. Artillery.
 Chapter 5. Small Arms.
 Chapter 6. Torpedoes.
 Chapter 7. Mines.
 Chapter 8. Depth-Charges.
 Chapter 9. Rockets and Guided Missiles.
 Chapter 10. Bombs.
 Chapter 11. Chemical Warfare.
 Chapter 12. Sighting and Ranging.
 The Navy's Future Weapons.

Notes

1947 non-fiction books
Books by L. Sprague de Camp
Books of naval history